Manolya Kurtulmuş (born 1 January 1998) is a Turkish basketball player for Fenerbahçe and the Turkish national team.

References

External links
 Manolya Kurtulmuş at FIBA
 Manolya Kurtulmuş at tbf.org
 Manolya Kurtulmuş at eurobasket.com

1998 births
Living people
Turkish women's basketball players
Fenerbahçe women's basketball players